This is a list of New South Wales Rugby League clubs by competition. There are over 450 clubs in New South Wales, across over 30 competitions administered by the NSWRL Conference (Sydney) and six regions.

National Rugby League

NSWRL Major Competitions

NSW Cup

Ron Massey Cup

Sydney Shield

Metropolitan Leagues (NSWRL Conference Competitions)

Central Northern Open Age (Manly/Norths/Balmain)

Central West Open Age/Parramatta JRL

Penrith Open Men's

Southern Open Age (Cronulla)

South Sydney A-Grade

Regional Leagues (Formerly CRL)

Region 1: East Coast Dolphins/Northern Rivers Titans

Northern Rivers Regional Rugby League 
  Ballina Seagulls
  Bilambil Jets
  Byron Bay Red Devils
  Casino Cougars
  Cudgen Hornets
  Evans Head Bombers
  Kyogle Turkeys
  Lismore Marist Brothers Rams
  Lower Clarence Magpies
  Mullumbimby Giants
  Murwillumbah Mustangs
  Northern United Dirrawongs (Lismore)
  Tweed Coast Raiders

Group 2 Rugby League 
  Bellingen Dorrigo Magpies
  Coffs Harbour Comets
  Grafton Ghosts
  Macksville Sea Eagles
  Nambucca Heads Roosters
  Orara Valley Axemen
  Sawtell Panthers
  South Grafton Rebels
  Woolgoolga Seahorses

Group 3 Rugby League 
  Forster Tuncurry Hawks
  Macleay Valley Mustangs
  Old Bar Beach Pirates
  Port City Breakers
  Port Macquarie Sharks
  Taree City Bulls
  Wauchope Blues
  Wingham Tigers

Hastings League 
  Beechwood Shamrocks
  Comboyne Tigers
  Harrington Hurricanes
  Kendall Blues
  Lake Cathie Raiders
  Laurieton Stingrays
  Long Flat Dragons
  Lower Macleay Magpies
  South West Rocks Marlins

Region 2: Greater Northern Tigers

Group 4 Rugby League 
  Boggabri Kangaroos
  Dungowan Cowboys
  Gunnedah Bulldogs
  Kootingal-Moonbi Roosters
  Manilla Tigers
  Moree Boars
  Narrabri Blues
  North Tamworth Bears
  Werris Creek Magpies

Group 19 Rugby League 
  Armidale Rams
  Bingara Bullets
  Bundarra Bears
  Guyra Super Spuds
  Glen Innes Magpies
  Inverell RSM Hawks
  Moree Boomerangs
  Narwan Eels (Armidale)
  Tingha Tigers
  Uralla-Walcha Tigers/Roos
  Warialda Wombats

Group 21 Rugby League 
  Aberdeen Tigers
  Denman Devils
  Greta-Branxton Colts
  Merriwa Magpies
  Murrurundi Mavericks
  Muswellbrook Rams
  Scone Thoroughbreds
  Singleton Greyhounds

Region 3: Bidgee Bulls

Canberra Rugby League 
  Belconnen United Sharks
  Goulburn City Bulldogs
  Gungahlin Bulls
  Queanbeyan Kangaroos
  Queanbeyan United Blues
  Tuggeranong Bushrangers
  West Belconnen Warriors
  Woden Valley Rams
  Yass Magpies

George Tooke Shield (Canberra Second Division) 
  Binalong Brahmans
  Boomanulla Raiders
  Boorowa Rovers
  Bungendore Tigers
  Burrangong Bears (Young)
  Cootamundra Bulldogs
  Crookwell Green Devils
  Gunning Roos
  Harden-Murrumburrah Hawks
  North Canberra Bears
  University of Canberra Stars

Group 9 Rugby League 
  Albury Thunder
  Gundagai Tigers
  Junee Diesels
  South City Bulls
  Temora Dragons
  Tumut Blues
  Wagga Wagga Brothers
  Wagga Wagga Kangaroos
  Young Cherrypickers

Group 16 Rugby League 
  Batemans Bay Tigers
  Bega Roosters
  Bombala Blue Heelers
  Cooma Stallions
  Eden Tigers
  Merimbula-Pambula Bulldogs
  Moruya Sharks
  Narooma Devils
  Snowy River Bears
  Tathra Sea Eagles

Group 17 Rugby League (Proten Community Cup) 
  Barellan Rams
  Goolgowi-Merriwagga Rabbitohs
  Hillston Bluebirds
  Ivanhoe Roosters
  Narrandera Lizards
  Rankins Springs Dragons

Group 20 Rugby League 
  Darlington Point-Coleambally Roosters
  Griffith Black & Whites
  Griffith Waratahs
  Hay Magpies
  Leeton Greenies
  Tullibigeal-Lake Cargelligo Sharks
  West Wyalong Mallee Men
  Yanco-Wamoon Hawks
  Yenda Blueheelers

Region 4: Western Rams

Peter McDonald Premiership 
  Bathurst Panthers
  Bathurst St Patrick's
  Blayney Bears (Reserve Grade Only)
  Cowra Magpies
  Lithgow Workmen's Club Wolves
  Mudgee Dragons
  Orange CYMS
  Orange Hawks
  Dubbo CYMS
  Dubbo Macquarie Radiers
  Forbes Magpies
  Nyngan Tigers
  Parkes Spacemen
  Wellington Cowboys

Group 12 Rugby League (Outback Rugby League) 
  Parntu Warriors
  Silver City Scorpions

Group 14 Rugby League (Castlereagh Cup) 
  Baradine Magpies
  Binnaway Bokbshells (LLT only)
  Cobar Roosters
  Coonabarabran Unicorns
  Coonamble Bears
  Dunedoo Swans
  Gilgandra Panthers
  Gulgong Terriers
  Narromine Jets

Group 15 Rugby League (Barwon Darling Cup) 
  Bourke Warriors
  Brewarrina Golden Googars
  Goodooga Magpies
  Lightning Ridge Redbacks
  Newtown Wanderers
  Walgett Dragons

Woodbridge Cup 
  Canowindra Tigers
  Cargo Blue Heelers
  CSU Bathurst Mungoes
  Condobolin Rams
  Eugowra Golden Eagles
  Grenfell Goannas
  Manildra Rhinos
  Molong Bulls
  Oberon Tigers
  Orange United Warriors
  Peak Hill Roosters
  Trundle Boomers

Mid West Cup 
  Carcoar Crows
  Kandos Waratahs
  Portland Colts

Region 5: Illawarra South Coast Dragons

Illawarra Rugby League 
  Collegians Red Dogs
  Corrimal Cougars
  Cronulla-Caringbah Sharks
  Dapto Canaries
  De La Salle Caringbah
  Helensburgh Tigers
  Thirroul Butchers
  Western Suburbs Red Devils
  Avondale Greyhounds
  Berkeley Eagles
  Figtree Crushers
  Mount Kembla Lowries
  Northern Suburbs
  Windang Pelicans
  Port Kembla Blacks
  Woonona-Bulli Bushrangers

Macarthur Division Rugby League (formerly Group 6) 
  Camden Rams
  Campbelltown City Kangaroos
  Campbelltown Collegians
  East Campbelltown Eagles
  Mittagong Lions
  Oakdale Workers Bears
  The Oaks Tigers
  Picton Magpies
  South West Goannas
  Thirlmere-Tahmoor Roosters
  Appin Dogs
  Bargo Bunnies
  Campbelltown Warriors
  ESA Magpies
  Glenquarie All Stars
  Liverpool Catholic Club Raiders JRLFC
  Mt Annan Knights
  Narellan Jets
  Oran Park-Gregory Hills Chargers
  Warragamba Wombats

Group 7 Rugby League 
  Berry-Shoalhaven Heads Magpies
  Gerringong Lions
  Jamberoo Superoos
  Kiama Knights
  Shellharbour Sharks
  Albion Park-Oak Flats Eagles
  Milton-Ulladulla Bulldogs
  Warilla-Lake South Gorillas
  Nowra-Bomaderry Jets
  Stingrays of Shellharbour
  Albion Park Outlaws
  Culburra Dolphins
  Robertson-Burrawang Spuddies
  Southern Highlands Storm (Bowral-Moss Vale)
  Sussex Inlet Panthers

Region 6: Newcastle & Central Coast

Central Coast Division Rugby League 
  Berkeley Vale Panthers
  Erina Eagles
  Kincumber Colts
  Terrigal Sharks
  The Entrance Tigers
  Toukley Hawks
  Woy Woy Roosters
  Wyong Roos
  Blue Haven Raiders
  Budgewoi-Buff Point Bulldogs
  Gosford Kariong Storm
  Northern Lakes Warriors
  Ourimbah Wyoming Magpies
  St Edwards Bears
  Umina Beach Bunnies
  Warnervale Bulls

Newcastle Rugby League 
  Central Charlestown Butcher Boys
  Cessnock Goannas
  Kurri Kurri Bulldogs
  Lakes United Seagulls
  Macquarie Scorpions
  Maitland Pumpkin Pickers
  Northern Hawks
  South Newcastle Lions
  Western Suburbs Rosellas
  Wyong Roos
  The Entrance Tigers

Newcastle & Hunter Rugby League 
  Aberglasslyn Ants
  Abermain-Weston Hawks
  Awabakal United
  Belmont South Rabbitohs
  Budgewoi Bulldogs
  Cardiff Cobras
  Central Charlestown Butcher Boys
  Clarence Town Cobras
  Dora Creek Swampies
  Dudley Magpies
  Dungog Warriors
  East Maitland Griffins
  Fingal Bay Bomboras
  Glendale Gorillas
  Gloucester Magpies
  Hamilton Ducks
  Hinton Hornets
  Karuah Roos
  Kearsley Crushers
  Kotara Bears
  Kurri Kurri Bulldogs
  Lakes United Seagulls
  Maitland Pickers
  Maitland United
  Mallabula Panthers
  Morisset Bulls
  Morpeth Bulls
  Ourimbah-Wyoming Magpies
  Northern Lakes Warriors
  Paterson River
  Raymond Terrace Magpies
  Shortland Devils
  South Newcastle Lions
  Stroud Raiders
  Swansea Swans
  Tall Timbers Timber Cutters
  Tea Gardens Hawks
  University of Newcastle Seahorses
  Wallsend Maryland Tigers
  Wangi Wangi Warriors
  Waratah Mayfield
  West Maitland
  West Wallsend Magpies
  Windale
  Woodberry

NSW Clubs in Victorian Competitions

Murray Cup (NSW Clubs) 
  Corowa Cougars
  CSU Muddogs
  Tumbarumba Greens (NSW)

NSW Clubs in QLD Competitions

Balonne Barwon Junior Rugby League 
  Mungindi Grasshoppers

Border Rugby League 
  Tenterfield Tigers

Gold Coast Rugby League 
  South Tweed Koalas
  Tweed Heads Seagulls

See also 
 New South Wales Rugby League
 Country Rugby League
 Rugby league in New South Wales

References 

Australian rugby league lists
Lists of rugby league clubs
Lists of sports teams in Australia
Lists of sports clubs in Australia